Richard M. Moose (February 27, 1932 – September 25, 2015) was an American executive and diplomat, who held senior government positions in Democratic administrations in the 1970s to 1990s.

Career
Born February 27, 1932 in Arkansas, Moose received his B.A. from Hendrix College in 1953 and M.A. from Columbia University in 1954. He began work as a Foreign Service Officer in 1956, with stints in Mexico and Cameroon. He worked on the National Security Council as staff secretary until 1970. He then worked on the staff of J. William Fulbright's Senate Foreign Relations Committee. He was appointed by President Carter as the U.S. Assistant Secretary of State for African Affairs from 1977 until 1981. Following some years in executive positions with Shearson Lehman and American Express, he returned to government service as Under Secretary of State for Management under President Clinton. He resigned from this position in August 1996.

References

External links

Assistant Secretaries of State for African Affairs
2015 deaths
1932 births
United States National Security Council staffers
United States Under Secretaries of State

Hendrix College alumni
Columbia University alumni